Khesht and Kamaraj District is a former district (bakhsh) in Kazerun County, Fars Province, Iran. At the 2006 census, its population was 30,227, including 6,596 families.  The District had two cities: Khesht and Konartakhteh.

The District is split into Khesht District and Kamaraj and Konartakhteh District.

References 

Kazerun County
Former districts of Iran
Districts of Fars Province